Thor Fritz Åke Sandin (born February 23, 1944) is a Swedish sprint canoer who competed in the late 1960s and early 1970s. He won a bronze medal in the K-4 10000 m event at the 1970 ICF Canoe Sprint World Championships in Copenhagen.

Sandin also finished fourth in the K-4 1000 m event at the 1968 Summer Olympics in Mexico City.

References

Sports-reference.com profile

1944 births
Canoeists at the 1968 Summer Olympics
Living people
Olympic canoeists of Sweden
Swedish male canoeists
ICF Canoe Sprint World Championships medalists in kayak